The SCNN1A gene encodes for the α subunit of the epithelial sodium channel ENaC in vertebrates. ENaC is assembled as a heterotrimer composed of three homologous subunits α, β, and γ or δ, β, and γ. The other ENAC subunits are encoded by SCNN1B, SCNN1G, and SCNN1D.

ENaC is expressed in epithelial cells and is different from the voltage-gated sodium channel that is involved in the generation of action potentials in neurons. The abbreviation for the genes encoding for voltage-gated sodium channel starts with three letters: SCN. In contrast to these sodium channels, ENaC is constitutively active and is not voltage-dependent. The second N in the abbreviation (SCNN1A) represents that these are NON-voltage-gated channels.

In most vertebrates, sodium ions are the major determinant of the osmolarity of the extracellular fluid. ENaC allows transfer of sodium ions across the epithelial cell membrane in so-called "tight-epithelia" that have low permeability. The flow of sodium ions across epithelia affects osmolarity of the extracellular fluid. Thus, ENaC plays a central role in the regulation of body fluid and electrolyte homeostasis and consequently affects blood pressure.

As ENaC is strongly inhibited by amiloride, it is also referred to as an "amiloride-sensitive sodium channel".

History 

The first mRNA encoding the alpha subunit of ENaC was isolated by two independent groups by screening a rat colon cDNA library.

Gene structure 

The human gene SCNN1A is located in the short arm of chromosome 12 (12p3).
 Human SCNN1A includes 13 exons spanning about 29,000 bp. The protein coding region is located in exons 2-13. The positions of introns are conserved in all four human ENaC genes. The positions of the introns are also highly conserved across vertebrates See: Ensembl GeneTree.

Analysis of α subunit mRNA from human lung and kidney showed that during transcription of SCNN1A gene different mRNAs are produced as a result of alternative translation initiation and splicing sites. The isoforms translated from these differ in their activities.

Tissue-specific expression 

SCNN1A, SCNN1B, and SCNN1G are commonly expressed in tight epithelia that have low water permeability. The major organs where ENaC is expressed include parts of the kidney tubular epithelia, the respiratory airway, the female reproductive tract, testis, including, spermatogonia in the seminiferous tubules, Sertoli cells, and spermatozoa, colon and salivary glands. In the skin, SCNN1A is expressed in the keratinocytes in the epidermal layer, in the sebaceous sweat glands, and the smooth muscle cells mostly within the cytoplasm. In contrast, in the eccrine sweat glands ENaC is mostly located on the luminal surface of eccrine duct epithelia.

ENaC is also expressed in the tongue, where it has been shown to be essential for the perception of salt taste.

The expression of ENaC subunit genes is regulated mainly by the mineralocorticoid hormone aldosterone that is activated by the renin-angiotensin system.

Protein structure 

The primary structures of all four ENaC subunits show strong similarity. Thus, these four proteins represent a family of proteins that share a common ancestor. In global alignment (meaning alignments of sequences along their entire length and not just a partial segment), the human α subunit shares 34% identity with the δ subunit and 26-27% identity with the β and γ subunits.

All four ENaC subunit sequences have two hydrophobic stretches that form two transmembrane segments named as TM1 and TM2.
In the membrane-bound form, the TM segments are embedded in the membrane bilayer, the amino- and carboxy-terminal regions are located inside the cell, and the segment between the two TMs remains outside of the cell as the extracellular region of ENaC. This extracellular region includes about 70% of the residues of each subunit. Thus, in the membrane-bound form, the bulk of each subunit is located outside of the cell.

The structure of ENaC has not been yet determined. Yet, the structure of a homologous protein ASIC1 has been resolved. The chicken ASIC1 structure revealed that ASIC1 is assembled as a homotrimer of three identical subunits. The authors of the original study suggested that the ASIC1 trimer resembles a hand holding a ball. Hence distinct domains of ASIC1 have been referred to as palm, knuckle, finger, thumb, and β-ball.

Alignment of ENaC subunit sequences with ASIC1 sequence reveals that TM1 and TM2 segments and palm domain are conserved, and the knuckle, finger and thumb domains have insertions in ENaC. Site-directed mutagenesis studies on ENaC subunits provide evidence that many basic features of the ASIC1 structural model apply to ENaC as well.

Associated diseases 

The disease most commonly associated with mutations in SCNN1A is the multi-system form of type I pseudohypoaldosteronism (PHA1B) that was first characterized by A. Hanukoglu as an autosomal recessive disease. This is a syndrome of unresponsiveness to aldosterone in patients that have high serum levels of aldosterone but suffer from symptoms of aldosterone deficiency with a high risk of mortality due to severe salt loss. Initially, this disease was thought to be a result of a mutation in the mineralocorticoid receptor (NR3C2) that binds aldosterone. But homozygosity mapping in 11 affected families revealed that the disease is associated with two loci on chromosome 12p13.1-pter and chromosome 16p12.2-13 that include the genes for SCNN1A and SCNN1B and SCNN1G respectively. Sequencing of the ENaC genes identified mutation in affected patients, and functional expression of the mutated cDNAs further confirmed that identified mutations lead to the loss of activity of ENaC.

In the majority of the patients with multi-system PHA1B a homozygous mutation or two compound heterozygous mutations have been detected.

A stop mutation in the SCNN1A gene has been shown to be associated with female infertility.

Interactions 

SCNN1A has been shown to interact with:
 NEDD4L, 
 NEDD4, and
 Ubiquitin C

See also 
 Epithelial sodium channel

Notes

References

Further reading

External links 
 

Sodium channels